Daniela Miglietta (born 12 November 1969 in Taranto, Italy) is an Italian singer, actress and novelist. She has released 11 albums in total.

Biography

In 1988 she took part in the Sanremo Music Festival in the New comers category with Sogno. It didn't happen, however it was noticed by the melodic songwriter Amedeo Minghi, who wrote the song Canzoni for her in the following year. Mietta won the New comers category and the critics award Mia Martini. In the same year she was awarded her first platinum album and the Telegatto as best new artist of 1989, with the support of votes from Italians.

In 1990 Amedeo Minghi, with his talent as a scout, sang a duet with her in Vattene amore, the song that won third place in the SanRemo Festival and has been interpreted into English 'All for the Love' by Nikka Costa. The song also won the OGAE, an international song contest, and became an evergreen, winning ten gold records. Her debut album, also entitled "Canzoni", went five times platinum and is published throughout Europe. In 1990 she again won two Telegattos: One for the song of the year and the other award for best female artist of the year.

Mietta returned to The SanRemo Festival in 1991 with Dubbi no, sung in English by Leo Sayer, and won another Telegatto as the female artist of the year. 
Her second album "Volano le pagine", which contains a cover version of Lover Man, won two platinum record awards.

In 1992 she released "Lasciamoci respirare" album and in 1994 "Cambia pelle", besides two duets with Riccardo Cocciante, "E Pensare Che Pensavo Mi Pensassi Almeno Un Po" and "Sulla Tua Pelle" from Cocciante's "Un Uomo Felice" album and another SanRemo with Figli di chi, song written by Nek.

In 1995 Mietta continued with musical experimentation, tackling different types of music, from soul to blues, from hip hop to the trip hop album "Daniela è felice". Her music video Oggi Dani è più felice won the MTV award in England as best foreign video transmitted for the year.

In 1996, she performed the speaking and singing voice of Esmeralda in the Italian-Language dub of The Hunchback of Notre Dame, but was later replaced by Franca D'Amato in the less successful 2002 direct-to-video sequel. She soon appeared in Zucchero's video  "Menta e rosmarino" and later debuts as an actress in  "La piovra" which was a popular Italian series.

In 1998 she was back to music with "La mia anima ", album with cover songs of popular black music.
In 2000 she again took part in the SanRemo Festival with Fare l'amore, a song composed by Mango and contained in her first greatest hits "Tutto o niente."

In 2002 she got a new role for dramatic actress in the TV film Donne di mafia. Electro-pop and arabesque sounds for the 2003 album Per esempio...per amore, produced and written by Mango.

In 2004 she took a duet with Morris Albert in SanRemo Festival with Cuore and in 2005 she participated in a talent show conducted by Simona Ventura, titled Music Farm.

In 2006, after a single R&B Bugiarda, she released a pop-rock album "74100", which is the postal code of Taranto (Mietta's city). The album also featured songwriters such as Martin Briley and Deekay.

In 2008 Mietta celebrated her 20th anniversary as an artist, returning for the 8th time at the Sanremo Music Festival with Baciami adesso, a song included in the album Con il sole nelle mani.

In 2011, after becoming a mother for the first time, Mietta returned to the music scene with a new album dedicated to human frailty entitled "Due soli...". The album, positioned between pop and rock, features tributes to two women: Marilyn Monroe and Sakineh Mohammadi Ashtiani. In the same year she debuted as a novelist with her first novel about women,"L'albero delle giuggiole", and narrated the audiobook "L'ultimo elfo", a fantasy written by Silvana De Mari.

In 2011 Mietta also participated as a mentor for Star Academy Italia.

In 2012 she participated in the talent show Tale e Quale Show, the Italian version of the Your Face Sounds Familiar franchise, where she does an imitation of Donna Summer, Jennifer Lopez and Maria Callas.

In 2016 Mietta returned to acting in two film: Ciao Brother and La fuga.

In 2017 she released two new singles with the jazz band Marea: the unusual Semplice and the cover Historia de un amor.

Discography
 Canzoni, 1990
 Volano le Pagine, 1991
 Lasciamoci Respirare, 1992
 Cambia Pelle, 1994
 Daniela è Felice, 1995
 La Mia Anima, 1998
 Tutto O Niente, 2000
 Per Esempio...Per Amore, 2003
 74100, 2006
 Con il Sole nelle Mani, 2008
 Due soli..., 2011

Cover
 Lover Man of Sarah Vaughan / Billie Holiday, 1991
 Just the Two of Us (Dentro L'Anima) of Bill Withers / Grover Washington Jr., 1995
  Watch Your Step (Un Passo Falso) of Anita Baker, 1998
 Hot Stuff (Musica che scoppia) of Donna Summer, 1998
 The Tracks of My Tears (Una Strada Per Te) of Smokey Robinson and The Miracles/ Mica Paris / Aretha Franklin / Johnny Rivers, 1998
 We All Need Love (Angeli Noi) of Double You, 1998
 Body Talk (Battito) of Imagination, 1998
 Second Time Around (Ancora Insieme a Te) of Shalamar, 2000

Filmography

Films

Television

Audiobooks
2011: "L'ultimo elfo", written by Silvana De Mari
2015: "Come l'ortica", written by Cristina Romano

Novels
2011: "L'albero delle giuggiole"
2017: "Tra l'acqua e l'olio"

References

External links

Mietta.it

1969 births
Living people
People from Taranto
Italian film actresses
Neo soul singers
Italian rhythm and blues singers
Torch singers
Sony BMG artists
Sanremo Music Festival winners of the newcomers section
21st-century Italian women singers